Cigarette cards are trading cards issued by tobacco manufacturers to stiffen cigarette packaging and advertise cigarette brands.

Between 1875 and the 1940s, cigarette companies often included collectible cards with their packages of cigarettes. Cigarette card sets document popular culture from the turn of the century, often depicting the period's actresses, costumes, and sports, as well as offering insights into mainstream humour and cultural norms.

History

Beginning in 1875, cards depicting actresses, baseball players, Native American chiefs, boxers, national flags, or wild animals were issued by the U.S.-based Allen & Ginter tobacco company. These are considered to be some of the first cigarette cards. Other tobacco companies such as Goodwin & Co. soon followed suit. They first emerged in the U.S., then the UK, then, eventually, in many other countries.

In the UK, W.D. & H.O. Wills in 1887 were one of the first companies to include advertising cards with their cigarettes, but it was John Player & Sons in 1893 that produced one of the first general interest sets 'Castles and Abbeys'.

Thomas Ogden soon followed in 1894 and in 1895, Wills produced their first set 'Ships and Sailors', followed by 'Cricketers' in 1896. In 1906, Ogden's produced a set of association football cards depicting footballers in their club colours, in one of the first full-colour sets.

Each set of cards typically consisted of 25 or 50 related subjects, but series of over 100 cards per issue are known. Popular themes were 'beauties' (famous actresses, film stars and models), sporters (in the U.S. mainly baseball, in the rest of the world mainly football and cricket), nature, military heroes and uniforms, heraldry, locomotives, and city views.

Imperial Tobacco Canada manufactured the first ice hockey cards ever for the inaugural NHL season. There were a total of 36 cards in the set, each one featured an illustration of a player. After World War I, only one more cigarette set was issued, during 1924–25.

Today, for example, sports and military historians study these cards for details on uniform design.

Some very early cigarette cards were printed on silk which was then attached to a paper backing. They were discontinued in order to save paper during World War II, and never fully reintroduced thereafter.

Doral, an R. J. Reynolds Tobacco Company brand, started printing cigarette cards in the year 2000. These were the first cigarette cards from a major manufacturer since the 1940s, although the small company Carreras in the UK issued cigarette cards with Turf brand cigarettes for a short period in the 1950s and 1960s, Black Cat brand in 1976.  Furthermore, card-like coupons with special offers have often been included in cigarette packets over the years.

The first set of "Doral Celebrate America" cards featured the 50 states in two releases, 2000 and 2001. Later themes include American festivals, cars, national parks, and 20th century events.

Natural American Spirit, another R.J. Reynolds Tobacco Company brand, also includes cigarette cards on their packs, with information on such things as windpower, diversity, and their farmers.

Philip Morris USA started including "Information For Smokers" cigarette cards in certain packs. One provides information on quitting smoking and the other states that "Light, "Ultra Light", "Mild", "Medium", and "Low Tar" cigarettes are just as harmful as "Full Flavor" ones.

World record price
The most valuable cigarette card in the world features Honus Wagner, one of the great names in U.S. baseball at the turn of the 20th century. The T206 Honus Wagner has repeatedly set records at auction, most recently in 2016 when it sold for $3,120,000. Wagner was a dedicated non-smoker and objected when America's biggest tobacco corporation planned to picture him on a cigarette card without his permission. Threats of legal action prevented its release, but a few slipped out, and it was one of these that stunned the collecting world when it was auctioned.

Other cigarette cards
Another notable and sought-after set of cards is the untitled series issued by Taddy and known by collectors as "Clowns and Circus Artistes".  While not the rarest cards in existence (there are a number of series in which only one known example remains), they are still very rare and command high prices whenever they come up for auction. The T206 Ty Cobb is another example of a notably rare cigarette card.

The Mecca cigarette trading card for George Sutton is also notable for it depicts him with hands. Sutton was known as "the handless billiard player" for mastering the game with such a handicap.

Apart from these examples, there are also cigarette cards that do not focus on people, but on cities or flags.

Classification and cataloguing
The system devised to codify 19th Century American tobacco issues has its origin in the 'American Card Catalog' (ACC), written by Jefferson Burdick. Burdick listed the American Tobacco cards in one section, broken down by companies that issued the card series and by the types of cards. The 19th Century issues were prefixed with 'N' (N1-N694) and the 20th with 'T'. (T1-T235).

The World Tobacco Index (WTI)
The World Tobacco Index (WTI), published by the Cartophilic Society of Great Britain (CSGB), lists all known tobacco issues from around the world and is still being updated today on reports of new finds. Using a similar alphanumeric system, it assigns a code based on the name of manufacturer, rather than the century in which the cards were issued. For example, Burdick's N2 'Celebrated American Indian Chiefs' by Allen & Ginter is listed as A400-030 (a), with the larger N42 series listed as A400-030 (b).

Legacy
The largest cigarette card collection on record is that of Edward Wharton-Tigar. His collection, bequeathed to the British Museum following his death in 1995, is recognised by the Guinness Book of Records as the largest collection of its kind. His autobiography, "Burning Bright", details both his obsession with collecting cigarette cards, as well as his business life, which included becoming President of Selection Trust – at the time, one of the largest mining companies in the world – as well as his lifelong passion for cricket, which culminated in his presidency of Kent Cricket Club. When asked what others thought of his collecting he said: "If to collect cigarette cards is a sign of eccentricity, how then will posterity judge one who amassed the biggest collection in the world? Frankly, I care not."

He was the president of the Cartophilic Society of Great Britain until his death in 1995.

Gallery

See also
American Tobacco Company
 Gallaher
 W.A. & A.C. Churchman
 Godfrey Phillips India
 Lambert & Butler
 Sniders & Abrahams
 Trade card
 Trading card

References

External links

 Leonard Brecher Tobacco & Chewing Gum Card Collection at the University of Louisville Art Library
 Cigarette and Trade Card Valuation 
Cigarette Cards: ABCs, at the New York Public Library Digital Gallery
 Catalogue of heraldic tobacco and trading cards
Duke Tobacco Company Cigarette Cards, at the Z. Smith Reynolds Library, Wake Forest University
 LCCC Valuing Cigarette and Trade Cards The London Cigarette Card Co. Ltd - The UK's largest supplier of cigarette, Trading cards including sport, military and modern day cards over 50 million in stock .
  The Cartophilic Society of Great Britain

Cigarettes
Collecting
Trading cards
Tobacciana
Postcards